Philippe Leveau (born 1940 in Angoulême) is a 20th-century French historian and archaeologist, a specialist of the ancient world.

Works 
 Caesarea de Maurétanie : une ville romaine et ses campagnes, Éditions de l'École française de Rome, 1984, X + 556 pages (recension here)
 Ph. Leveau et J.-L. Paillet, L'alimentation en eau de Caesarea de Maurétanie et l'aqueduc de Cherchel (in collaboration with J.-L. Paillet), Ed. L'Harmattan, Paris 1976, 185 pages, 10 plans hors-texte.
 J. Gascou, Ph. Leveau et J. Rimbert, Inscriptions latines de la cité d'Apt, Supplément à Gallia, Paris, CNRS, 1997, 220 p.
 Burnouf J. et Leveau Ph., (dir.), Fleuves et Marais, une Histoire au Croisement de la Nature et de la Culture. Sociétés préindustrielles et milieux fluviaux, lacustres et palustres : pratiques sociales et hydrosystèmes, CTHS, Paris, 2004.
 Ph. Leveau et J.P. Saquet ., Milieu et sociétés dans la vallée des Baux, Supplément 31 à la Revue Archéologique de Narbonnaise, 390 p.
 Leveau Ph. et Rémy B., La ville des Alpes occidentales à l’époque romaine, CHRIPA, Grenoble, 2008.

References

External links 
 List of publications on Academia.edu
 List of publications on CAIRN

20th-century French historians
French archaeologists
Academic staff of the University of Provence
People from Angoulême
1940 births
Living people